Avonelle Lake is a lake in Tuolumne County, California, in the United States.

Avonelle Lake was named for the daughter of a Yellowstone National Park ranger.

See also
List of lakes in California

References

Lakes of Tuolumne County, California
Lakes of Yosemite National Park